Tête nucléaire océanique (TNO or oceanic nuclear warhead) is a French thermonuclear warhead intended for use on the M51.2 submarine-launched ballistic missile, that is being developed and built by the Division of Military Applications (DAM) at France's Commissariat à l'énergie atomique et aux énergies alternatives (English: Atomic Energy and Alternative Energies Commission). It will be carried on Triomphant-class submarines. The TNO is intended to replace the currently deployed TN 75 warhead. Its commissioning was planned for 2015, when France's newest submarines, either [[French submarine Terrible (S619)|Le Terrible]] or Le Vigilant, will be one of the first to carry the warhead.

 Yield 
The TNO has a yield that is estimated to be 100 kilotons of TNT (kt). The warhead's charge is called "robust":  less optimized than the TN 75 but with an improved reliability and life-span.  Development of the technology in the warhead has benefited from the final series of French nuclear tests conducted in 1995-1996 in Moruroa, French Polynesia. The warhead's design and functionality were ultimately validated through simulation, particularly with DAM's Tera 100 supercomputer, Megajoule laser, and radiographic equipment. Production of the TNO is estimated to be complete, although it is not yet in France's operational stockpile of nuclear weapons.

 Classification of related data 
The information presented in this article can only be indicative because underlying data is classified by the French government.

 See also 
 Force de frappe Force océanique stratégique''
 Nuclear tests by France

References 

Nuclear warheads of France
Submarine-launched ballistic missiles of France
Nuclear weapons program of France